Caris Roane is an author of paranormal romance novels. As Valerie King she is also the author of Regency romance novels and won a 2005 Career Achievement Award for Regency Romance from Romantic Times.

The Guardians of Ascension Series
Caris Roane’s Guardians of Ascension series is about winged vampire warriors sworn to protect human women.

Bibliography

The Guardians of Ascension Series
 Ascension, St. Martin’s Press, 2010
 Burning Skies, St. Martin’s Press, 2011
 Wings of Fire, St. Martin’s Press, 2011
 Brink of Eternity, St. Martin’s Press, 2011
 Born of Ashes, St. Martin’s Press, 2012
 Obsidian Flame, St. Martin’s Press, 2012
 Gates of Rapture, St. Martin's Press, 2012

The Blood Rose Series
 Embrace the Dark, Spencerhill Associates, 2012
 Embrace the Magic,
 Embrace the Mystery,
 Embrace the Passion,
 Embrace the Night,
 Embrace the Wild,
 Embrace the Wind,

Men in Chains
Born in Chains, St. Martin's Press, 2013
Savage Chains, St. Martin's Press, 2014
Chains of Darkness, St. Martin's Press, 2014
Savage Chains: Captured (#1), St. Martin's Press, 2014
Savage Chains: Scarred (#2), St. Martin's Press, 2014
Savage Chains: Shattered (#3), St. Martin's Press, 2014
Unchained St. Martin's Press, 2014

References

External links
 
 

21st-century American novelists
American women novelists
Living people
Pseudonymous women writers
American romantic fiction writers
Women romantic fiction writers
21st-century American women writers
Year of birth missing (living people)
21st-century pseudonymous writers